Brachiopsilus is a genus in the handfish family Brachionichthyidae.

Species
The currently recognized species in this genus are:
Prior to this sighting, it had been assumed that this species was confined to shallow waters. The discovery that it has a greater range than previously thought may give cause for optimism regarding its survival.
 Brachiopsilus dossenus Last & Gledhill, 2009 (Humpback handfish)
 Brachiopsilus ziebelli Last & Gledhill, 2009 (Ziebell's handfish)

References

External links 
 National Geographic, including photos

Brachionichthyidae
Marine fish genera
 
 
Taxa named by Peter R. Last